Paul Toupin (December 7, 1918 – March 8, 1993) was a Quebec journalist, essayist and playwright.

Early life and education 
Born in Montreal on December 7, 1918, he studied at Collège Jean-de-Brébeuf, the Sorbonne, Columbia University and Aix-Marseille University.

Career 
In addition to his writing and journalism, he taught at the Université de Sherbrooke and Loyola University.

His plays included Le Choix (1951), Brutus (1952), Le Mensonge (1960), Chacun son amour (1961) and Son dernier rôle (1979). Alongside poet Paul Chamberland and novelist Jean-Paul Pinsonneault, he was one of the first prominent openly gay writers in Quebec literature, addressing gay themes in his 1964 essay collection L'Écrivain et son théâtre and writing more openly about his own sexuality in his memoirs Mon mal vient de plus loin (1969) and Le cœur a ses raisons (1971).

He won Quebec's Prix David in 1952 for Brutus, and the Governor General's Award for French-language non-fiction at the 1960 Governor General's Awards for Souvenirs pour demain.

Personal life 
He died in Montreal on March 8, 1993. The Paul Toupin Archives are kept in the Montreal archives center of the Bibliothèque et Archives nationales du Québec.

Honors 
 1950 : Prix David
 1952 : Prix de littérature de la province de Québec
 1960 : Governor General's Award for French-language non-fiction
 Member of the Académie des lettres du Québec

References 

1918 births
1993 deaths
20th-century Canadian dramatists and playwrights
Writers from Montreal
Canadian male dramatists and playwrights
Canadian gay writers
Governor General's Award-winning non-fiction writers
Canadian dramatists and playwrights in French
Canadian non-fiction writers in French
20th-century Canadian male writers
Canadian memoirists
Canadian LGBT dramatists and playwrights
Gay memoirists
Canadian male essayists
20th-century Canadian essayists
20th-century memoirists
20th-century Canadian LGBT people
Gay dramatists and playwrights